John Byrd Going was a Democratic member of the Mississippi House of Representatives, representing Calhoun County, from 1908 to 1920 and from 1940 to 1948.

Biography 
John Byrd Going was born on January 26, 1873, in Pittsboro, Calhoun County, Mississippi. His parents were David Going and Martha Caroline (Pilgreen) Going. He launched a newspaper, the Dixie Herald, in 1903 and became the editor. He married Ronda Steele in 1906. He was first elected to the Mississippi House of Representatives to represent Calhoun County as a Democrat on November 5, 1907. He was re-elected in 1911 and 1915. He also represented Calhoun County in the House from 1940 to 1944. He was re-elected and served from 1944 to 1948.

References 

1873 births
Year of death missing
Democratic Party members of the Mississippi House of Representatives
People from Calhoun County, Mississippi
Editors of Mississippi newspapers